Yashio Station (八潮駅, Yashio-eki) is a passenger railway station located in the city of Yashio, Saitama, Japan, operated by the Metropolitan Intercity Railway Company. Its station number is TX08.

Lines

Station layout
The station consists of two elevated island platforms serving four tracks, with the station building underneath. Trains generally stop at the outer platforms (1 and 4), but when a faster train stops or passes through the station, the inner platforms are used to hold the slower trains.  Yashio is one of three stations on the Tsukuba Express ( and ) where parallel tracks allow for trains traveling in the same direction to pass each other.  Some trains terminate at Yashio Station, especially during the morning commuter rush between Yashio and the Akihabara  terminal. Immediately north of the station are four tracks that can hold trains as they are taken out of service, or put into service.

Platforms

History
The station opened on 24 August 2005, coinciding with the opening of the Tsukuba Express line.

Passenger statistics
In fiscal 2019, the station was used by an average of 24,809 passengers daily (boarding passengers only).

Surrounding area
 Metropolitan Expressway No. 6 Misato Line Yashio PA 
Yashio City Ose Elementary School
Yashio City Ohara Junior High School

See also
 List of railway stations in Japan

References

External links

 TX Yashio Station 

Railway stations in Japan opened in 2005
Railway stations in Saitama Prefecture
Stations of Tsukuba Express
Yashio, Saitama